Netaji Subhas University (NSU), formerly Netaji Subhas Institute of Business Management (NSIBM), is a private university at Pokhari on the outskirts of Jamshedpur, Jharkhand, India.

History
The university was approved by the Jharkhand cabinet on 18 July 2018 and the Bill for its establishment was summarily passed on 21 July. The university was formally established in September 2018 under Netaji Subhas University Act, 2018 and was inaugurated in October 2018. It is the second private university in the Kolhan division, following Arka Jain University.

See also
Education in India
List of private universities in India
List of institutions of higher education in Jharkhand

References

External links
 

Education in Jamshedpur
Universities in Jharkhand
Educational institutions established in 2018
2018 establishments in Jharkhand
Private universities in India